The Ordre des ingénieurs du Québec (OIQ) is the self-regulatory body that governs Quebec's 65,000 professional engineers. In Quebec, the OIQ carefully monitors compliance with rules of this trade and with the professional integrity of its members while also overseeing the development of the engineering profession.

References 

https://www.oiq.qc.ca/fr/aPropos/Pages/histoire.aspx

Engineering societies based in Canada
Professional associations based in Quebec
Organizations based in Montreal